Douglas Vautin (26 July 1896 – 11 January 1976) was an Australian cricketer. He played one first-class match for Tasmania in 1929/30.

See also
 List of Tasmanian representative cricketers

References

External links
 

1896 births
1976 deaths
Australian cricketers
Tasmania cricketers
Cricketers from Hobart